Malva maritima can refer to:

Malva maritima (Gouan) Pau, a synonym of Malva subovata (DC.) Molero & J.M.Monts.
Malva maritima Lam., a synonym of Malva tournefortiana L.
Malva maritima Salisb., a synonym of Althaea officinalis L.